Pseudocalotes flavigula, the Malaya false bloodsucker, yellow-throated forest agamid, or yellow-throated false garden lizard, is a species of agamid lizard. It is found in Malaysia.

References

Pseudocalotes
Reptiles of Malaysia
Reptiles described in 1924
Taxa named by Malcolm Arthur Smith